The 2022–23 Vanderbilt Commodores women's basketball will represent Vanderbilt University in the 2022–23 college basketball season. Led by second year head coach Shea Ralph, the team will play their games at Memorial Gymnasium and are members of the Southeastern Conference.

Schedule and results

|-
!colspan=12 style=|Non-conference regular season

|-
!colspan=12 style=|SEC regular season

|-
!colspan=9 style=| SEC Tournament

See also
 2022–23 Vanderbilt Commodores men's basketball team

References

Vanderbilt Commodores women's basketball seasons
Vanderbilt Commodores
Vanderbilt Commodores women's basketball
Vanderbilt Commodores women's basketball